Editas Medicine, Inc., (formerly Gengine, Inc.), is a clinical-stage biotechnology company which is developing therapies for rare diseases based on CRISPR gene editing technology. Editas headquarters is located in Cambridge, Massachusetts and has facilities in Boulder, Colorado.

History
Editas Medicine was originally founded with the name "Gengine, Inc." in September 2013 by Feng Zhang of the Broad Institute, Jennifer Doudna of the University of California, Berkeley, and George Church, David Liu, and J. Keith Joung of Harvard University, with funding from Third Rock Ventures, Polaris Partners and Flagship Ventures; the name was changed to the current "Editas Medicine" two months later. Doudna quit in June 2014 over legal differences concerning intellectual property of Cas9.

In August 2015, the company raised $120 million in Series B funding from Bill Gates and 13 other investors. it went public on 2 February 2016, with an IPO that  raised $94 million.

The company entered into a strategic collaboration with Juno Therapeutics in 2015 to combine its CRISPR-Cas9 technology with Juno's experience in creating chimeric antigen receptor and high-affinity T cell receptor therapeutics to the end of developing cancer therapeutics. Juno was later acquired by Celgene, which was in turn acquired by Bristol Myers Squibb.

The company announced in 2015 that it was planning a clinical trial in 2017 using CRISPR gene editing techniques to treat Leber congenital amaurosis type 10 (LCA10), a rare genetic illness that causes blindness. On 30 November 2018, the FDA gave permission to start the trials,  under the investigational name EDIT-101 (also known as AGN-151587).  In September 2021, a statement from Editas claimed that preliminary results from clinical trials were promising and support clinical benefits of EDIT-101 treatment.

In March 2020, Editas, in partnership with Allergan, was the first to use CRISPR to try to edit DNA inside a person's body (in vivo). As part of the clinical trial, a patient who was nearly blind as a result of Leber's congenital amaurosis received an intravitreal injection containing a harmless virus carrying CRISPR gene-editing instructions. Five months later, Editas reworked its deal with Allergan's owner AbbVie and regained full rights to their range of eye disease treatment therapies, including EDIT-101 for the treatment of LCA10.

In 2019, the company was building new chemistry facilities in Boulder, Colorado.

Katrine Bosley was CEO until 2019, when she was replaced by board member Cynthia Collins. Collins was replaced  in 2021 by James Mullen, who had been board chairman. Gilmore O'Neill, former CMO of Sarepta Therapeutics, became CEO on June 1, 2022, with Mullen staying on as executive chairman of the board.

Research
Editas works with two different CRISPR nucleases, Cas9 and Cas12a.

EDIT-101 is a CRISPR based gene therapy for treatment of Leber congenital amaurosis, which is currently in clinical trials.

EDIT-301 is an experimental  potential treatment  utilizing the firm's CAS 12a editing technology for sickle cell disease and beta-thalassemia. In 2019 the firm reported early success in research on the drug;. In December 2020, it filed an IND application for treatment of sickle cell disease.  In January 2021, it said it had received clearance from the FDA for phase 1 safety studies.

References

Pharmaceutical companies of the United States
Companies based in Cambridge, Massachusetts
Companies listed on the Nasdaq
Gene therapy
Health care companies based in Massachusetts
Pharmaceutical companies established in 2013
Biotechnology companies of the United States